Justin Alexandre Prata Isidro (born July 19, 1988) is a Canadian soccer player who is currently playing for Caldas Sport Clube.

Early life
Isidro was born in Burnaby, British Columbia, raised in Pitt Meadows.

Career

Early career
Isidro began his football career with only five years by Metro Ford Soccer Club in Coquitlam and joined after nine years to Sporting Club Vancouver.

Professional career
He started his professional football career in the age from fifteen under Tony Fonseca, the Head Coach from Vancouver Whitecaps called the young player in January 2004 to the USL First Division team who earned his first senior caps. Only six months after his senior call-up left Vancouver Whitecaps in July 2004 and started his Europe adventure, he signed for Portuguese club Vitória. He played regularly for the youth and reserve team between June 2008, in July 2008 signed a one-year contract with Caldas.

Position
He plays as a striker or attacking midfielder.
Current club Vancouver Olympics FC, coached by Dino Anastopulos in Canada. Playing since DEC- 2011  till current. Same club in Canada that Daniel Fernandes former PAOK Salonika FC goalkeeper and Gianluca Zavarise former Canadian International and TORONTO FC- MLS.Vancouver Olympics FC has been a stepping stone to professionalism for many Canadian soccer players.

International career
Isidro played four years for the Canadian U-16 BCSA Provincial team and was later called up for a training camp of the U-17 Canadian National team.

References

1988 births
Living people
Sportspeople from Burnaby
Canadian people of Portuguese descent
Canadian expatriate soccer players
Canadian soccer players
Soccer people from British Columbia
Association football midfielders
Primeira Liga players
Vitória S.C. players
Vancouver Whitecaps (1986–2010) players
USL First Division players
People from Pitt Meadows